Musharraf Al-Ruwaili  (born October 10, 1985) is a Saudi football player who plays for Tuwaiq a midfielder.

References

1985 births
Living people
Saudi Arabian footballers
Place of birth missing (living people)
Al-Qaisumah FC players
Al-Orobah FC players
Al-Jabalain FC players
Al-Lewaa Club players
Al-Zulfi FC players
Tuwaiq Club players
Saudi First Division League players
Saudi Professional League players
Saudi Fourth Division players
Saudi Second Division players
Association football midfielders